Cooperstown is a 1993 American drama film directed by Charles Haid and written by Lee Blessing. The film stars Alan Arkin, Graham Greene, Maria Pitillo, Charles Haid, Ed Begley Jr., Josh Charles and Paul Dooley. The film premiered on TBS on January 26, 1993.

Plot

Cast

References

External links
 

1993 television films
1993 drama films
1993 films
American baseball films
1990s drama road movies
American ghost films
American drama road movies
Films directed by Charles Haid
Films set in Florida
Films set in New York (state)
TBS original films
American drama television films
1990s English-language films
1990s American films